is the Japanese fifth tier of league football, which is part of the Japanese Regional Leagues. It covers the four prefectures that comprises the Shikoku Region, which are: Shikoku (Kagawa, Tokushima, Ehime and Kōchi).

2022 clubs  

Source: Shikoku League Website

Shikoku Soccer League Champions

References

External links 
 Shikoku Soccer League
 Shikoku Football Association
 2022 Shikoku Football League
 Japanese association football league system
 Japanese Regional Leagues

Football leagues in Japan